Anna Stothard (born 1983), is a British novelist, journalist and scriptwriter, and the daughter of Sally Emerson and Sir Peter Stothard.

Writing history 
Her first novel, Isabel and Rocco,, was published when she was 19. "Dazzling... remarkably accomplished," wrote The Observer. She has written for a number of newspapers, including columns for The Observer and The Sunday Telegraph.

She read English at Lincoln College, Oxford. Her first screenplay won a Scottish Screen and BBC Scotland Fast Forward Features prize. She was awarded a scholarship with the Masters programme at the American Film Institute, Los Angeles, which she attended until 2008.

Her second novel, The Pink Hotel, was longlisted for the 2012 Orange Prize.

References

External links
Isabel and Rocco, Random House. Retrieved 9 November 2015.
Isabel, Elliot Edizioni

1983 births
21st-century British women writers
British women novelists
21st-century British novelists
British journalists
British women journalists
Living people
People educated at South Hampstead High School
Alumni of Lincoln College, Oxford
People educated at Westminster School, London